Liliana Ichim (born 12 October 1967) is a Romanian alpine skier. She competed in two events at the 1984 Winter Olympics.

References

1967 births
Living people
Romanian female alpine skiers
Olympic alpine skiers of Romania
Alpine skiers at the 1984 Winter Olympics
People from Vatra Dornei